Rob Rush (born 14 November 2000) is a New Zealand rugby union player who plays for the  in Super Rugby. His playing position is flanker. He was named in the Blues squad for the 2023 Super Rugby Pacific season. He was also a member of the  2022 Bunnings NPC squad, having represented them since 2020.

The son of former All Black Eric Rush and brother of New Zealand Sevens representative Brady Rush, he began playing rugby at the age of five, originally beginning out as a lock, before moving to the flanker position.

References

External links
itsrugby.co.uk profile

2000 births
New Zealand rugby union players
Living people
Rugby union flankers
Northland rugby union players
Blues (Super Rugby) players